Hong Kong Buddhist Hospital is a public, community hospital with 324 beds in Lok Fu, Hong Kong, within walking distance of Lok Fu station. It is under the Kowloon Central Cluster managed by the Hospital Authority.  Hospital Chief Executive is Dr LAU Sze-ting.

History
Hong Kong Buddhist Hospital was found by the Hong Kong Buddhist Association. It was started building in 1966 and completed in 1970. It was then opened on 12 March 1971 by the Hong Kong Governor, David Trench. The hospital provided 350 beds and cost HK$14 million, HK$2 million of which was donated by the Royal Hong Kong Jockey Club.

Services
, the hospital had 324 beds and around 370 members of staff. For the year ended 31 March 2013, it had treated 8,631 inpatients and day-patients, 11,464 specialist outpatients, and 45,432 general outpatients.

References

Wong Tai Sin District
Hospitals in Hong Kong
1971 establishments in Hong Kong
Hong Kong Buddhist Association
Religious hospitals